Frank Michael Tritico (March 25, 1909 - March 5, 1966), sometimes listed as Frank Mitchell Tritico, was an American football coach. He was the head coach of the Randolph Field football team during World War II. His 1943 Randolph Field Ramblers football team compiled a 9–1–1 record, including a 7–7 tie with Texas in the 1944 Cotton Bowl Classic.  The 1944 team compiled a perfect 12–0 record, outscored opponents by a total of 408 to 19, and was ranked No. 3 in the final AP poll. Football statistician and historian Dr. L. H. Baker selected Tritico's 1944 squad as national champions for 1944.

Prior to World War II, Tritico coached high school football for LaGrange High School in Lake Charles, Louisiana. He later owned the Tritico Mattress Factory in Lake Charles. He died of a heart attack in 1966 at Lake Charles.

Head coaching record

College

References

1909 births
1966 deaths
Randolph Field Ramblers football coaches
High school football coaches in Louisiana
People from Lake Charles, Louisiana